The Airedale and Wharfedale Senior Cricket League was established in 1936 and is an amateur cricket competition in North Yorkshire and West Yorkshire. The league is structured into 6 divisions, with two clubs promoted and relegated into each division respectively. The league set-up was restructured in 2018 allowing club 2nd XI teams to be promoted into divisions that were previously reserved for 1st XI teams.

Participating clubs are spread over a relatively wide geographical area in North Yorkshire and West Yorkshire. The location of the clubs broadly follow the valleys and landscapes of the River Aire and the River Wharfe.

2022 Member Clubs 
As of 2022, the league consists of six divisions of 12 teams, with a further two divisions primarily for a member club's 3rd XI.

Division One
 Addingham
 Beckwithshaw
 Bilton 
 Burley-in-Wharfedale
 Collingham and Linton 
 Horsforth Hall Park
 Ilkley
 New Rover
 North Leeds
 Otley
 Rawdon
 Saltaire

Division Two
 Adel
 Bardsey
 Calverley St. Wilfrids
 Colton Institute 
 Follifoot
 Green Lane
 Harden
 Horsforth
 Olicanian
 Pool
 Steeton 
 Tong Park Esholt

Division Three
 Alwoodley
 Bolton Villas
 Guiseley 
 Ilkley 2nd XI
 Kirkstall Educational 
 Leeds Modernians 
 Menston 
 North Leeds 2nd XI
 Old Leodiensians 
 Rawdon 2nd XI
 Skipton 
 Thackley

Division Four
 Adel 2nd XI
 Burley-in-Wharfedale 2nd XI
 Collingham and Linton 2nd XI
 Green Lane 2nd XI
 Horsforth Hall Park 2nd XI
 Kirkstall Educational 2nd XI
 Otley 2nd XI
 Pool 2nd XI
 Saltaire 2nd XI
 Shadwell 
 St. Chads Broomfield 
 Tong Park Esholt 2nd XI

Division Five 
 Addingham 2nd XI
 Bardsey 2nd XI
 Bilton 2nd XI
 Bolton Villas 2nd XI
 Calverley St. Wilfrids 2nd XI
 Guiseley 2nd XI
 Horsforth 2nd XI
 Menston 2nd XI
 New Rover 2nd XI
 Olicanian 2nd XI
 Steeton 2nd XI

Division Six 
 Alwoodley 2nd XI
 Beckwithshaw 2nd XI
 Colton Institute 2nd XI
 Follifoot 2nd XI
 Harden 2nd XI
 Leeds Modernians 2nd XI
 Old Leodiensians 2nd XI
 Shadwell 2nd XI
 Skipton 2nd XI
 St. Chads Broomfield 2nd XI
 Thackley 2nd XI

Champions

Source: League Honours 1936 - 2017

Performance by season from 2000

References

English domestic cricket competitions
Cricket competitions in Yorkshire
Cricket in North Yorkshire
Cricket in West Yorkshire